Byram is an unincorporated community within Kingwood Township in Hunterdon County, New Jersey, United States. 

In 1855 a bridge was built across the Delaware River north of Byram to connect with Point Pleasant, Pennsylvania. The Point Pleasant-Byram Bridge existed until 1955 when it was destroyed by the Great Flood of 1955 brought on by Hurricane Diane. 

Byram also once had a railroad station along Pennsylvania Railroad's Belvidere Division which opened back in 1852 when the railroad reached Byram. The station was also destroyed in the Great Flood of 1955 and was never rebuilt. The railroad continued to be used for freight until 1978 when it was abandoned and subsequently demolished for a recreational trail in the early 1980s.

References

Kingwood Township, New Jersey
Unincorporated communities in Hunterdon County, New Jersey
Unincorporated communities in New Jersey